The Barbados Civil Aviation Department (BCAD) is the civil aviation authority of Barbados. It has its headquarters on the property of Sir Grantley Adams International Airport in Christ Church. The department is headed by the Director of Civil Aviation, who is supported by one Technical Officer, five Inspectors, a Chief Aeronautical Information Service Officer, a Chief Air Traffic Control Officer and other support staff.  It is governed under the Civil Aviation Act of 2004.  The department was created to advise the Ministry of International Business and International Transport, who is responsible for the regulation and control of all aspects of civil aviation in Barbados.  BCAD cooperates with other regional authorities in the Caribbean under the bloc known as the Caribbean Aviation Safety and Security Oversight System (CASSOS)

Aircraft registered in Barbados must carry the identification mark "8P-".  The Barbados Civil Aviation allows three categories for aircraft registration in the country:
 (i) the Government,
 (ii) a citizen of Barbados, or
 (iii) a body incorporated under the Companies Act, or in a Commonwealth country; or a Contracting State and having its principal place of business in Barbados, or in another Commonwealth country, or Contracting State.

Footnotes
CIVIL AVIATION BILL, 2004
CIVIL AVIATION (AMENDMENT) ACT, 2007
CIVIL AVIATION (AMENDMENT) Bill, 2011 – currently proposed by Parliament

References

External links

 
Ministry of Transport & Works

Barbados
Aviation organisations based in Barbados
Government agencies of Barbados
Organizations investigating aviation accidents and incidents